IROC XXIX was the 29th season of the Crown Royal International Race of Champions, which began on Friday February 12, 2005 at Daytona International Speedway. The all-star roster included twelve drivers from eight premier racing series. Mark Martin dominated the season, winning two races and finishing well ahead in the points standings, earning him a record-setting fifth IROC title. As with IROC XXVIII, the drivers used their car colors and numbers from their native series (when feasible).

The roster of drivers and final points standings were as follows: 



Race One (Daytona International Speedway)
6- Mark Martin
8- Martin Truex Jr.
4- Bobby Hamilton
17- Matt Kenseth
15- Buddy Rice
16- Max Papis
20- Danny Lasoski
03- Hélio Castroneves
97- Kurt Busch
01- Scott Pruett
11- Steve Kinser
2- Sébastien Bourdais

Race Two (Texas Motor Speedway)
2- Sébastien Bourdais
6- Mark Martin
15- Buddy Rice
8- Martin Truex Jr.
4- Bobby Hamilton
16- Max Papis
20- Danny Lasoski
11- Steve Kinser
17- Matt Kenseth
03- Hélio Castroneves
97- Kurt Busch
01- Scott Pruett

Race Three (Richmond International Raceway)
6- Mark Martin
97- Kurt Busch
17- Matt Kenseth
15- Buddy Rice
8- Martin Truex Jr.
01- Scott Pruett
20- Danny Lasoski
11- Steve Kinser
16- Max Papis
2- Sébastien Bourdais
03- Hélio Castroneves
4- Bobby Hamilton

Race Four (Atlanta Motor Speedway)
8- Martin Truex Jr.
6- Mark Martin
17- Matt Kenseth
03- Hélio Castroneves
20- Danny Lasoski
2- Sébastien Bourdais
15- Buddy Rice
11- Steve Kinser
16- Max Papis
4- Bobby Hamilton
01- Scott Pruett
97- Kurt Busch

References

International Race of Champions
2005 in American motorsport